Shukor bin Zailan (born 8 December 1985) is a retired Singaporean footballer who last played as a midfielder for S.League club Warriors. He is a natural playmaker.

He has previously played for S.League clubs Sembawang Rangers, Paya Lebar Punggol, Young Lions and Home United. He was previously Head Coach of COE team Warriors U13 and U14. In 2016, he made the switch and is the current coach of Hougang United U15

External links
 
 
 https://web.archive.org/web/20110925143014/http://www.fas.org.sg/news/i-lived-250-month

Singaporean footballers
Home United FC players
Tampines Rovers FC players
Warriors FC players
Living people
1985 births
Sembawang Rangers FC players
Hougang United FC players
Young Lions FC players
Singapore Premier League players
Singapore international footballers
Association football midfielders